Begotten is a 1989 American experimental film written, produced, edited, shot, and directed by Edmund Elias Merhige. It stars Brian Salsberg, Donna Dempsy, Stephen Charles Barry, and members of Merhige's theatre company, Theatreofmaterial. The film contains no dialogue and employs a style similar in some ways to early silent films. Its enigmatic plot, drawn from elements of various creation myths, opens with the suicide of a godlike figure and the births of Mother Earth and the Son of Earth, who set out on a journey of death and rebirth through a barren landscape. According to art historian Scott MacDonald, the film's allegorical qualities and purposeful ambiguity invite multiple interpretations.

Begotten was first conceived as an experimental theatre piece with dance and live musical accompaniment, but Merhige switched to film after deciding that his vision would be too expensive to achieve as a production for live audiences. Antonin Artaud and philosopher Friedrich Nietzsche were major influences on Begotten, as Merhige believed their ideas and theories had not been explored in film to their full extent. The film's visual style was inspired by Georges Franju's documentary short Blood of the Beasts, Akira Kurosawa's Seven Samurai, Stan Brakhage's The Act of Seeing with One's Own Eyes, and the German Expressionist film The Cabinet of Dr. Caligari. Begotten was shot on location in New York and New Jersey over a period generally thought to have been three and a half years  although, in an interview, Merhige said filming took only five and a half months.

Once the film was finished, Merhige spent the next two years trying to find a distributor willing to market it. Following its debut at the Montreal World Film Festival, it was screened at the San Francisco International Film Festival, where it was seen by film critics Tom Luddy and Peter Scarlet. They brought it to the attention of fellow critic Susan Sontag, whose enthusiastic praise and private screenings of the film in her own home were instrumental to its eventual release. Though largely ignored by main-stream critics, it attained cult film status and influenced several avant-garde film-makers, visual artists and musicians. The film's scarcity on home video prompted its fans to spread their own bootleg copies, a phenomenon described as a "copy-cult" by film studies scholar Ernest Mathijs. As the first part of a planned series, Begotten was followed in 2006 by Din of Celestial Birds, a short sequel with the theory of evolution as its dominant theme.

Plot
Inside a small shack, a robed figure  dubbed "God Killing Himself" in the film's credits  disembowels himself using a straight razor. After removing some of his internal organs, the robed god dies. A woman, Mother Earth, then emerges from his mutilated remains. She brings the corpse to arousal and uses his semen to impregnate herself. Time passes and Mother Earth, now visibly pregnant, stands beside the coffin of the dead god. Wandering off into a vast and barren landscape, Mother Earth later gives birth to Son of Earth, a malformed convulsing man. He is soon abandoned by his mother, who leaves him to his own devices.

After an untold period of time wandering across the barren landscape, the Son of Earth encounters a group of faceless nomads who seize him by his umbilical cord. Upon being captured, the Son of Earth begins to vomit up what appears to be organs, which the nomads excitedly accept as gifts. They then throw the man into a fire pit, where he burns to death. Son of Earth is resurrected by Mother Earth, who comforts her newly reborn offspring before they continue together across the barren landscape. The nomads soon return and proceed to attack the Son of Earth as Mother Earth stands in a trance-like state. Turning their attention to her, the nomads knock her to the ground, rape, and murder her as her son watches helplessly near-by.

Once the nomads have left, a group of robed figures arrive to carry away Mother Earth's mutilated, disemboweled remains. The group returns to murder and disembowel her son, placing pieces of both mother and son into jars, which they bury into the crust of the earth. As time passes, the burial site soon becomes lush with flowers. A montage of grainy photographs depicting God Killing Himself are shown. In the final scene, Mother Earth and her son appear in a flash-back, wandering through a forested path.

Cast
 Brian Salzberg as God Killing Himself:
A mysterious, robed entity who disembowels himself with a straight razor. He is also the father of Mother Earth and Son of Earth, the latter of which was born through artificial insemination.
 Donna Dempsey as Mother Earth:
A female entity based on the earth deity of the same name. She is the mother of Son of Earth, whom she conceived via artificial insemination. 
 Stephen Charles Barry as Son of Earth (Flesh on Bone):
The deformed, convulsing son of Mother Earth and God Killing Himself. Barry would later reprise his role in the film's sequel, Din of Celestial Birds, which was also written and directed by Merhige.

Members of Merhige's theater company Theatreofmaterial – which included Adolpho Vargas, Arthur Streeter, Daniel Harkins, Erik Slavin, James Gandia, Michael Phillips, and Terry Andersen  provided additional credits for other characters in the film such as the Nomads and Robed Figures.

Themes
Critics have identified several major themes in Begotten. In interviews, Merhige himself has acknowledged that he intentionally incorporated these themes into the film, while also inviting viewers to form their own interpretations of the film.

Death and rebirth

Several critics have noted that Begotten contains an underlying theme of death and rebirth,
 recurring throughout most of the director's works. In an interview with Marty Mapes of Movie Habit, Merhige stated, "I've always believed in the continuity of consciousness. I don't think the body dying means it's over. It just means that there's a transformation taking place. So what we call physical death is not something that I think is some sorrowful loss."

In her review of Merhige's third film Suspect Zero for the Los Angeles Times, Elaine Dutka noted that themes of death and rebirth that appeared throughout the director's works might have been inspired by a near-death experience Merhige had suffered during his youth at age nineteen. Author and independent filmmaker John Kenneth Muir pointed out the film's ideas of suffering, death, and rebirth as being exemplified in the Son of Earth's journey. As Muir noted, the character's mistreatment, through various means intentionally drew parallels to mankind's 'painful' toil and reshaping of the earth for the purpose of planting crops, which represented the bringing forth of life through suffering. Muir also pointed out the film's characters as visualized symbols of certain concepts of mankind and the earth itself, with the depictions of life, death, and renewal as representing the four seasons. Film and literary scholar William E.B. Verrone also noted these themes, pointing out that, as the viewers, we are encouraged to mourn the film's characters (father/mother/son) through the agony and torment inflicted upon them. Verrone further elaborates that through these depictions of death and violence, we are then symbolically  "offered salvation" in its depiction of the blossoming flowers seen growing on their graves. In the book Contemporary North American Film Directors: A Wallflower Critical Guide, co-author Jason Wood noted that the film's "evocation of the body as the source of horror and decay" was redolent of surreal works by Luis Buñuel and early David Lynch. Wood also compared the film's grainy look and landscapes to the recurring themes of hopelessness and desolation in the works of Russian filmmaker Aleksandr Sokurov.

Religion, mythology, and the occult

Many critics have pointed out the film's incorporation of various religious and mythological themes and events from Christian, Celtic, and Slavic mythology including various Creation myths, Mother Earth, and other religious themes, on which the events that take place in the film are loosely based. Merhige, a firm believer in alchemy and hermeticism, has acknowledged that the film was deliberately arranged to appear as part of a mythology. According to film and literary scholar William E.B. Verrone, Begottens core storyline was a mixture of ancient mythologies that dealt with stories and themes, such as the birth of a divine entity and their subsequent suffering through various means, citing the film as "a cryptic passion play about Earth's birth and torture". Verrone went on to explain that the film's highly symbolic and metaphorical plot was intended to evoke a response different than that offered in more traditional cinematic offerings. Art historian Scott MacDonald pointed out that the film's highly allegorical plot represents many of the popular attitudes towards both the origins of life and religion, which have been put forth over the span of several centuries. MacDonald also interpreted the film's plot as the death of god or deity, and the birth and rape of Nature. In their book Cult Cinema: An Introduction, film studies scholars Ernest Mathijs and Jamie Sexton noted that the film "makes perhaps the most serious attempt to visualize elements of Dionysian orgiastic cultism in combination with Gnostic and pagan myths". Robert DiMatteo pointed out the film's ritualistic and religious aspects such as the idea of "God's eye".

The film's opening sequence shares many similarities with various creation myths, specifically those in which life is generated from the corpse or dismemberment of an originator deity. Art historian Herbert S. Lindenberger felt that Merhige had reworked myths that social anthropologist and folklorist Sir James Frazer had published during the Victorian era. Lindenberger also noted the film's inclusion of themes taken from Christianity such as the "buried god", his resurrection, and the inclusion of god's mother.

Janet Maslin  of The New York Times categorized the film as a mixture of ancient mythologies, which were reworked in what she called "visceral, monstrously immediate terms". Film critic Richard Corliss from Time pointed out that it contained multiple references to Druidism. Corliss also noted the film's mixture of druidism with several biblical stories such as the Creation (Genesis), the Nativity, and Christ's torture/death.

Influences
Merhige was informed by the theories and ideas of Antonin Artaud and Friedrich Nietzsche, which in his opinion had not been developed on film to the fullest extent. His key cinematic influences included Munk, Eisenstein, and Buñuel.  In a 1993 interview with art historian Scott MacDonald, Merhige also listed Georges Franju's documentary short Blood of the Beasts as an inspiration for the visual style of the film, as well as Akira Kurosawa's Seven Samurai, Stan Brakhage's The Act of Seeing with One's Own Eyes, and the German expressionist film The Cabinet of Dr. Caligari. Merhige also stated that "fine arts had far more of an influence on this project than film. The horrific beauty you find in Hieronymus Bosch or Munch or Goya got to me more than anything."

Critics have identified a variety of other possible influences. Film critic Eric D. Snider has pointed out that David Lynch's Eraserhead might also have influenced the film's visual style.  While comparing Begottens opening sequence to the eye slicing scene in Buñuel's Un Chien Andalou, Film Comments Robert DiMatteo also noted Dimitri Kirsanoff's Ménilmontant, tribal art, ethnographic studies, Tobe Hooper's Texas Chain Saw Massacre, as well as the paintings of Piero Francesca as possible influences on the film.

Production

Development and pre-production

Begotten was written, produced, and directed by Merhige, with development for the film beginning in the mid-to-late 1980s, although some sources list the date as 1984. Merhige had studied at New York State University, and soon developed an interest in the theater after attending several performances while in Manhattan. Merhige would later state in an interview that he had been drawn towards the use of performers creating a highly visualized form of storytelling through dramatic movement to provoke, what Merhige called, "an otherworldly response". He was particularly fascinated by a Japanese dance troupe called Sankai Juku which, the director later learned, consisted of a handful of core members that were well in tune with one another, knowing each other completely on both a professional and personal level. Wanting to accomplish a similar group dynamic, Merhige founded Theatreofmaterial, a small theater production company based in New York City. 
After working on several different experimental theater productions, he began developing his next project, which was initially for the theater. As Merhige would later recall, the initial concept for the film was envisioned as a dance production at the Lincoln Center, which would have been set to a live orchestra. It was only after discovering that it would cost a quarter of a million dollars to produce that the decision was made to adapt the script for a motion picture instead of a theater production.
Merhige also wanted to document the company's work, as many of its members were transitioning to other projects. Interviewed in 2013 by horror film magazine Fangoria, Merhige revealed that the film itself had also been an attempt to document many of the thoughts and ideas he was going through at the time, believing that if he did not "get it out there" they would overwhelm him.

Still only twenty at the time, he wrote the film's script in six months. Before working on Begotten, he had previously made several short films such as Implosion (1983), Spring Rain (1984), and A Taste of Youth (1985). These were well-received, and gave the director the experience and insight he needed while working on Begotten. Merhige developed the film's script with members of Theatreofmaterial, who worked as both cast and crew during production. They decided that the film should be silent and that they would strive to evoke what the director called "emotions on the fringes", which they felt were avoided by most directors and actors. In preparation for writing the script, Merhige and members from Theatreofmaterial performed intense, ritual breathing exercises as a group. As Merhige explained, "We would breathe to the point of hysteria and create these moments of panic. Afterwards, we would analyze what the experience was all about. It was an intimate science." He brought portions of the script to the cast members and began a process of rehearsals followed by group discussion and reflection on the material as it took shape. Over a period of four-and-a-half months, the group gradually translated the script's abstract ideas into more concrete, enactable scenes, though Merhige emphasized that the rehearsals were focused on group cohesion rather than precise choreography. Merhige later revealed to UltraCulture host Jason Louv that he strove to imbue the film with the same tribal and ritual aspects associated with alchemical and hermetic traditions. To that end he worked closely with the film's cast, experimenting with various techniques such as hypnosis and meditation in order to help the cast achieve a mental state of what he called "universal stream" rather than having the actors simply mimic those aspects.

Filming
Principal photography took place in the mid-to-late 1980s, over a period of three-and-a-half months in several different locations. Merhige filled multiple roles in the film's production, including work on cinematography, and special effects, the latter using a 16mm Arriflex camera on black-and-white reversal film. He had previously worked on several short film subjects before developing Begotten. The opening sequence depicting the robed figure (listed in the credits as "God Killing Himself") disemboweling himself and Mother Earth emerging from his remains was the first to be shot. The sequence was then edited and shown to the cast and crew, whose reactions to the footage was very enthusiastic, with Merhige stating: "it proved to everyone that this was an important film, that there really was nothing else like it, and we were actually going to make it happen." Most of the cast and crew were paid little to nothing, with their forms of payment being free room and board, and Merhige himself paying for all of their expenses. In his book Film Out of Bounds: Essays and Interviews on Non-Mainstream Cinema Worldwide, film historian Matthew Edwards cited Begotten as an example of low-budget films outside of Hollywood which displayed unique flair and artistry that rivaled most Hollywood productions, in spite the fact that they were made under a very low budget.

A majority of the film was shot at a construction site on the border between New York City and New Jersey, where Merhige had been given permission to shoot for a period of twenty days when construction crews were not working. Members of the construction site would occasionally lend the film crew a hand by constructing landscapes when certain shots of mountains were needed during a scene. Scenes involving time-lapses of sunrises and sunsets were shot by the director, who spent a couple of days alone in the mountains near Santa Fe or Albuquerque. Funding for the film came from Merhige's grandfather, who had set Merhige up with a trust fund for medical school. Additional costs were paid by Merhige from income he received while working multiple jobs as a special effects artist. Merhige described working on the film as being a powerful, almost ceremonial experience that "changed the lives of all those involved" with the project.

Post-production and visual effects

Before Begotten, Merhige had worked as a special effects designer for various companies, including a brief job for a Disney television series that involved rotoscoping. These jobs had provided him with the technical knowledgeand savingshe needed to handle the film's post-production and visual effects on his own.

The visuals have a decayed look, as if the film itself were an artifact that has been damaged and degraded over vast stretches of time; Merhige said

Before and during the film's shooting, he had experimented with the reel to give it an old, withered look. In one such experiment, he ran the unexposed negative against sandpaper to scratch its surface before shooting. Unsatisfied with the results, Merhige decided to use an optical printer for further processing. The "rephotography" removed almost all of the gray midtones from the footage's visible spectrum, leaving only extreme contrasts of black and white. He was unable to find an optical printer priced within his budget, so he built one himself. He constructed the printer over a period of eight months with spare parts from camera stores and special effects houses where he had worked before.

The process proved to be time-consuming. Each minute of footage generated by the optical printer took between eight and ten hours to complete. Once a test shot was sent to the laboratory for development, minuscule mistakes in calibration would sometimes ruin the shot and require the process to start all over again. Merhige began asking laboratories if they would be willing to adjust their usual development procedures to his custom specifications, but was repeatedly turned away. Eventually, he found a small studio willing to accommodate his requests: Kin-O-Lux Labs, located on Manhattan's 48th Street and owned by a German-American émigré named Fred Schreck. Merhige quickly developed a friendship with Schreck, who allowed the director to use the laboratory to develop the footage while teaching him how to develop footage by hand. Schreck's name appears under "special thanks" in the film's end credits. At one point during the editing process, Merhige enlisted his father's input on certain scenes, stating that his father was "very open-minded" to the project. Merhige used similar "rephotography" techniques for segments of his next film, Shadow of the Vampire.

Soundtrack
Begotten contains no dialogue. Merhige envisioned "a time that predates spoken language", in which "communication is made on a sensory level." The film's soundtrack  including sound effects and music  was composed and mixed by Evan Albam. Merhige hired Albam on the recommendation of Tim McCann, the film's assistant director. Albam had a job painting houses at the time and, prior to Begotten, composed only in his spare time. Merhige and Albam worked together closely in order to find the right balance of visual and audio cues. The soundtrack took a year to complete. The music is ambient and dirge-like, and the sound design is fleshed out by natural sounds such as bird calls, insect noises, and the sounds of a heartbeat.

Release

Distribution
Once editing for Begotten was completed, Merhige spent two years trying to find a distributor willing to market and release it. Merhige screened the film to possible distributors but most refused to release the film as it did not fit into a specific genre, making it difficult to bring the film to market. Merhige later recalled, "When I first went looking for distribution, everyone laughed at me, saying 'We don't know what this is...'" Merhige then took it to a number of museums in hopes of eventually finding a distributor. In the end, only two showed any interest, but both were turned down by Merhige who felt that they would not have been the right choice. As a result, Merhige became very protective of the film, only showing it to people he felt he could trust. Through these private screenings, film critics Tom Luddy and Peter Scarlet would eventually view the film, becoming fascinated by its distinct visual style. Although uncertain how the film would be received, Luddy and Scarlet were able to put together several screenings of the film at the San Francisco International Film Festival, before showing the film to fellow critic Susan Sontag. Sontag, who set up a private screening at her home for twenty of her closest friends, would become one of the Begottens leading advocates and instrumental for its eventual theatrical release. Sontag later brought a copy of the film to the Berlin Film Festival where she informally screened it to interested cinéastes, proclaiming it to be an artistic masterpiece. During one of Sontag's screenings, it was supposedly viewed by director Werner Herzog, whom Merhige later claimed was "very supportive of the film".

Theatrical screenings

Unable to find a distributor, Begotten did not attain either wide or limited theatrical release. However, it became a popular underground film, as a film released outside of conventional commercial channels, especially one with subversive or transgressive content. Lacking a standard theatrical release, Merhige booked one-off screenings at various film festivals and art museums.

The earliest public screening took place at the Goethe-Institut in Montreal on October 24, 1989, as part of the Montreal World Film Festival. It had three screenings from May 57 at the 1990 San Francisco International Film Festival, marking its premiere in the United States. It also premiered later that year in New York at the Museum of Modern Art, on October 22 with Merhige introducing the film, followed by a post-screening discussion with the audience. New York City's Film Forum would also screen the film on June 5, 1991. It was exhibited at the Stadtkino Theater in Vienna in 1992, as a part of a retrospective of American independent cinema titled "Unknown Territories".

It screened at the Berlin Film Festival in the early to mid1990s, and on October 20, 2014, was shown at Brooklyn's Spectacle Theater as a part of its fourth annual "Spectober" film event. The film appeared at the third annual horror film festival SpectreFest on October 28, 2015 along with its spiritual sequel Din of Celestial Birds followed by an onstage discussion with Merhige. The film was shown at the Music Box Theatre in Midtown Manhattan on September 25, 2016, during its 25th Anniversary celebration, where it was screened from Merhige's personal 16mm print. It was viewed as a double-feature alongside the director's other film Shadow of the Vampire, and was followed by a Q&A with Merhige. The film was later screened at the Short Film Festival in London on January 8, 2017, where it was shown again in its original 16mm format, accompanied by a live music score from the film. It was screened on October 17, 2019 at the Rice Media Center, as part of a celebration of "Low-Fi" Analog film series.

Home media and bootlegging

Begotten has received very limited home media distribution after its theatrical release. The film is out of print and difficult to acquire in secondhand markets.  
Initially, Merhige did not intend for the film to be released on home video at all, stating in an interview with Scott MacDonald that he had previously hated the concept of home video as a medium. Merhige eventually changed his mind and felt that the original soundtrack mix, with which he had not been completely satisfied, could be enhanced through the medium.

The film was briefly released on VHS by World Artists Home Video on March 10, 1995.
It was later given a very limited DVD release by World Artists on February 20, 2001 and included a souvenir booklet, the original theatrical trailer, rare and never-before-seen movie stills, and production photos. World Artists' DVD release of the film was listed by Film Comments Gavin Smith as the ninth of his "Top 10 DVD Picks".
This edition of the film has long been out of print.

Due to the film's severely limited availability on home media, its fans began to spread it through bootleg copies and digital piracy. The circulation of unlicensed copies has almost certainly overtaken legitimate distribution in volume. The film is typically encountered via ambiguously legal methods, a situation whichaccording to Mathijs and Sextonfostered a "copy-cult" that enhanced its cult status. The film was reportedly banned in Singapore due to its graphic and disturbing content.

On July 29, 2016, Merhige announced via Instagram that the film would be released for the first time on Blu-ray in the fall of that year. However, the distribution deal fell through, and a second announcement, during its 25th-anniversary screening alongside Shadow of the Vampire at Music Box Theatre in Midtown Manhattan, did not provide a release date either.

Reception

Critical reception

Begotten has received little to no attention from film critics, with most mainstream reviewers ignoring the film entirely. Merhige was initially afraid that audiences would misunderstand parts, or the entire film altogether, "When I finished the film, I felt sure it would be misunderstood and consigned to the underground again. I see it as a very serious, very beautiful work of art, but when it was first finished, I was always thinking, 'What if everybody just laughs? What if they don't see anything in it?' There is always that possibility." Reactions to the film upon its release were extremely polarized, but Merhige has stated that he remains grateful for starting his career with the film.

Limited reviews of the film were mixed to positive, with some critics praising the film's unique visual style and resonating themes, while noting its graphic violence. Susan Sontag—one of the leading advocates for the film—praised it, referring to it as "a metaphysical splatter film" and "one of the 10 most important films of modern times". Reviewing the film for arts and culture magazine Film Comment gave the film significant acclaim, calling the opening sequence "a triumph of lyrical grotesquerie", and compared it to the avant-garde works of Maya Deren, and Stan Brakhage. In his review of Film Forum's 1991 screening, Joe Kane of the New York Daily News praised the film's minimalist soundtrack, visuals, and its subversion of traditional narrative structure. Marc Savlov from the Austin Chronicle called the film "Experimental, haunting, dreamlike, and intentionally confounding",  also citing that the film's grainy visuals, and horrific imagery as having an influence on the VHS sequences in The Ring series, and the works of Guy Maddin. Adrian Halen from Horror News.net opined its use of symbolism from Christianity and Egyptian mythology, in addition to the ambiguity of what was displayed on the screen, created a unique viewing experience that was admittedly not always easy to digest. Jonathan Rosenbaum at the Chicago Reader called it a "remarkable if extremely upsetting" film, applauding the originality of its visuals, but cautioned that its graphic violence was not for the squeamish or the faint of heart. The Christian Science Monitors, David Sterritt would compare it favorably to  Samuel Beckett's novel How It Is in regards to its symbolism and narrative structure. Sterritt also noted the film's claustrophobic atmosphere, and dark narrative was hard to stomach but equally entrancing overall. Independent film critic Dennis Schwartz awarded the film a grade B+, comparing its graphic imagery to paintings by Francis Bacon, adding further praise towards its visual style.  Mexican film critic Marco González Ambriz called the film "magnificent" and a must-see "for anyone interested in the cinematic avant-garde", although he also noted that many viewers would likely find the film unbearable.

Although some critics were favorable towards its visuals and narrative themes, others would criticize these same elements, in addition to its brutal violence and running time. Awarding it two and a half out of a possible four stars, author and independent filmmaker John Kenneth Muir felt its narrative was better suited as a short subject rather than a feature film, in spite of its admittedly powerful imagery and originality. Echoing this sentiment, Polish journalist Bartłomiej Paszylk thought the first half was compelling and genuinely frightening, its narrative could have been accomplished at a much shorter length. Its graphic violence and visuals were criticized by Janet Maslin of The New York Times, who felt it was "too grotesque" to engage its audience, regardless of its unique narrative.

Legacy
Begotten has gradually developed a cult following over the years and is considered by some to be the director's masterpiece. As one film critic noted, Begotten  "earned its reputation as an endlessly provocative and mystifying experience always centuries ahead of the rest of American cinema". It was listed in the 2011 book 100 Cult Films by Ernest Mathijs and Xavier Mendik over Mendik's objections, as he felt its following was too small to merit inclusion. However, it ultimately made it in because, to Mathijs, its following represented "the real sectarian cult; it's a very small committed group of people. It's like a secret handshake that goes worldwide. If you've seen Begotten, you're in that cult."

Begotten has been included in multiple lists at various media outlets.
In 2012, Complex included the film on its list of 50 Most Disturbing Movies. Sarah Gibson from Highsnobiety listed it in her 10 of the Most Damaged and Disturbing Movies Ever Made. It was placed at #10 on AskMen's 10 Hard-To-Stomach Horror Movies, stating that the film was "so miserable that it likely wouldn't have seen the light of day were it not for Susan Sontag". Taste of Cinema.com listed it at #13 in its 20 Most Disturbing Movies of All Time, summarizing, "Begotten possesses a haunting, atmospherically visceral quality that has yet to be surpassed... Combine Merhige's avant-garde film style with sequences of torture and unsettling imagery, and you get one of the most shocking experimental pictures of all time." It was placed at #4 on Nylon "8 Most Disturbing Horror Films Ever Made". In his article "10 Horror Movies Too Intense Even for Halloween", Screen Rants Jason Wojnar ranked the film at #8, citing its unsettling imagery, unconventional narrative, and visual style "makes it hard to tell what is even happening during the unsettling events." Entertainment Weekly included the film in its "13 of the Most Disturbingand Critically AcclaimedMovies to Ever Hit Theaters", describing it as "kind of like if Alejandro Jodorowsky told the story of creation filtered through the lens of Eraserhead." Joblo placed the film at #4 in their list of the "Top Ten Most Disturbing Films Ever", with the author stating that it was their personal favorite out of all the films listed. The website would later place film at #8 in their "Top 10 Trippy Horror Movies You Don't Want to See While Stoned!", referring to it as "[a] relentless visual bombardment of grotesquery". In his 2014 book Disorders of Magnitude: A Survey of Dark Fantasy, author Jason V. Brock listed the film as his seventh favorite work of radio, film, or television production. Several sources have mistakenly reported that Time ranked Begotten in its top-ten list of either 1990 or 1991, but the film was not included either year. Entertainment news website MovieWeb included the film in their "Best Arthouse, Avant-Garde Horror Movies of All Time" in 2022, calling it an 'unforgettable  experiment of horror'.

The film's critical success provided a foundation for Merhige to continue his filmmaking career. He went on to direct the critically acclaimed Shadow of the Vampire and the less well-received Suspect Zero. Nicolas Cage, a co-producer of Shadow of the Vampire, advocated hiring Merhige to direct the project based on his positive impression of Begotten.

Merhige was later hired by singer Marilyn Manson to direct music videos for his songs "Antichrist Superstar" and "Cryptorchid", the latter utilizing imagery that was heavily incorporated from Begotten. Manson was a huge admirer of Begotten, having the album's art designer P. R. Brown watch the film for inspiration while developing cover art for the album. Manson personally contacted Merhige to ask him if he would be willing to direct the music video for his song "Cryptorchid". Manson has stated that Begotten was played on a loop during the entire recording for his album Antichrist Superstar. The music video for "Cryptorchid" premiered at the San Francisco International Film Festival in 1997 where it won a Golden Gate Certificate of Merit Award. It was subsequently barred from release by Interscope Records, whom Manson claimed were "appalled by it", due to its fascist iconography, namely the Nuremberg rallies, along with U.S. military footage and images of a Ku Klux Klan lynching. "Antichrist Superstar" was also beset with troubles and remained unreleased until it was leaked on YouTube in 2010.
Merhige has since become a prominent member of the theatre, directing numerous stage plays which include A Dream Play, an adaption of William Shakespeare's A Midsummer Night's Dream, and Waiting for Godot.

Din of Celestial Birds
Merhige considers Begotten the first entry in an incomplete trilogy. It is followed by the 14-minute short film Din of Celestial Birds. As with Begotten, Merhige fulfilled multiple roles during its production, functioning as the writer, director, and producer. Din of Celestial Birds was funded with assistance from the Q6 production group, a collective of philosophers and artists. His principal inspiration for Din of Celestial Birds came from silent films such as Jean Cocteau's Blood of a Poet (1930), Fritz Lang's Metropolis (1927), and the works of the Lumière brothers.

He intended the short as a depiction of "creation in its simplest and purest form". Focusing on the theory of evolution instead of religion and mythology, the film opens with the text that reads: "Hello and welcome ... do not be afraid ... be comforted ... remember ... our origin...", followed by images depicting the Big Bang. Then, after a hyper-accelerated trip through the evolution of life and the Earth, it culminates in the birth of an embryonic pseudo-humanoid called the Son of Light (Stephen Charles Barry) that reaches to some unknown source.

Din of Celestial Birds premiered on Turner Classic Movies on September 15, 2006. The film was also screened at the European Media Art Festival in 2009 as a part of that year's theme, "The Future Lasts Longer Than The Past". It was later screened alongside its predecessor at the SpectreFest Film Festival in 2015.

Influence
Since its release, Begotten has become a minor influence on several avant-garde and experimental films, and has been cited by several artists as inspiration for some of their works.

Michael Pope's acclaimed 2001 experimental film Neovoxer has been compared to Begotten, featuring a similar visual style and "impressionistic mythology". According to Panos Cosmatos the flashback sequences in his 2010 film Beyond the Black Rainbow were directly inspired by  Begotten. When interviewed by CHUD.com's Joshua Miller, Cosmatos stated that he had wanted the flashback sequences to 'have the look and feel of an artifact that was in the process of deterioration', and Begottens visual style was the perfect look for these sequences. Kyle Turner from Mubi.com compared the 2015 experimental film Ville Marie as being very similar to Merhige's film in terms of cinematic style, and use of reverse-exposure.

Certain scenes in Can Evrenol's 2015 surrealist horror film Baskin were compared to Begotten.  James Quinn's 2017 experimental horror film Flesh of the Void was noted by several critics as being similar to Merhige's film in style and narrative. However, Quinn himself stated, in an interview with Nightmare on Film Street, that he felt his film did not fall into the same category. Certain scenes from Blake Williams' 2018 avant-garde science fiction film Prototype were compared to Begotten by Glenn Kenny of The New York Times. Jimmy Joe Roche's 2018 experimental short film, Skin of Man, was also said to have been influenced by Begotten.

The film's influence has also extended into the music world. American music artist Zola Jesus listed the film as a major inspiration for her 2017 music album Okovi, revealing in an interview with ARTnews that during development of the album, she would play the film on loop in order to help with Okovis audio and visual aesthetic. For their experimental musical composition Frankenstein Bemshi! at the 2018 Rochester Fringe Festival, performers Dave Esposito and G. E. Schwartz mixed portions of Begotten with the 1910 film Frankenstein, accompanied by live guitar music, electronic soundscapes, spoken narration, and with poetry added as text to the movie's image. Lead singer Dimitri Giannopoulos, from the American rock band Horse Jumper Of Love, revealed that the single "Airport", from their 2019 album So Divine, was partially inspired by Begotten. Heavy metal magazine Decibel compared the music video for the Texas gothic rock band Sword Collector's single "Inherit the Scepter" to Begotten and Ari Aster's 2019 folk horror film Midsommar.

See also
 List of cult films
 List of horror films of the 1990s
 List of films shot over three or more years
 List of films banned in Singapore
mother!, a 2017 film by Darren Aronofsky, based on a controversial themes of the same biblical allegories.

References

Notes

Citations

Bibliography

Books

Periodicals

Further reading

External links

Begotten links

Din of Celestial Birds links
 
 

1989 films
1989 directorial debut films
1989 horror films
1980s avant-garde and experimental films
1989 independent films
American avant-garde and experimental films
American black-and-white films
American independent films
American silent films
American splatter films
American supernatural horror films
Censored films
Fiction about deicide
Films directed by E. Elias Merhige
Films shot in New Jersey
Films shot in New Mexico
Films shot in New York (state)
Films without speech
Fiction about God
Metaphysical fiction films
Religious horror films
1980s American films